Leonardo de Jesús Pérez Juárez (born 10 February 1993) is a Paralympic athlete from Mexico who competes in T52 track and field events.

Athletics career
Pérez, who is classified as a T52 classification wheelchair racer, represented Mexico at the 2012 Summer Paralympics in London competing in the 200, 400 and 800 metres races. He was disqualified in the first round of the 400m event, but came fifth in the 200 metres and won a bronze medal in the 800 metres. As well as Paralympic success, Pérez has won two medals at the IPC Athletics World Championships, both coming in 2013 in Lyon, with a silver in the 800 m and bronze in the 200 m.

Personal history
Pérez was born in Mexico in 1993 and attended the International College for Experienced Learning in Mexico City.

References 

1993 births
Athletes (track and field) at the 2012 Summer Paralympics
Athletes (track and field) at the 2020 Summer Paralympics
Living people
Medalists at the 2012 Summer Paralympics
Medalists at the 2020 Summer Paralympics
Mexican male middle-distance runners
Mexican male sprinters
Mexican male wheelchair racers
Paralympic athletes of Mexico
Paralympic bronze medalists for Mexico
Paralympic medalists in athletics (track and field)
21st-century Mexican people